is a 1995 scrolling shooter arcade game by Seibu Kaihatsu. It is a spin-off in the Raiden series set in space.

Gameplay
The game is set in outer space. Players pilot their space fighter through eight stages of enemy space fleets and bosses. Enemies include small space fighters, space cruisers, space frigates, and entire space installations.

A bonus is assessed at the end of each stage taking into account the number of medals collected, the number of enemies destroyed, the number of bombs in stock, and the total kill percentage. At the end of the game, a grand tally is assessed. Factors taken into account are the number of continues used and the number of lives lost.

Plot
By the year 2050, mankind begins the colonization of multiple planetary systems in the search for habitable planets. While the colonists establish original cultures and scientific studies, many of them begin feuding with each other. Armed conflict breaks out among them and the Earth. One rebel faction rises to great power and makes Earth their primary target. Earth's response is Operation Viper Phase 1: to combat the rebels using advanced space fighters built from downed enemy ships.

Differences in the new version
A new version of Viper Phase 1 was released with gameplay changes. The new version is known as Viper Phase 1: USA in the United States. The known differences between the versions:
Secondary weapons: The original version of Viper Phase 1 has limited ammunition in the secondary weapons. The amount of remaining secondary weapon ammunition is indicated by a meter on the screen. All secondary weapons in the original version are fully powered-up. The new version changes the secondary weapons into permanent weapons with different levels of power. The new version's secondary weapons deal less damage than those in the original version to compensate for the unlimited ammunition of the new version.
Bomb deploy times: The new version speeds up the deploy time of the bomb. The Raiden Fighters series uses this bomb deploy time of the new version as part of the Judge Spear's guest appearance.
Medals: Taking a cue from the mechanics of Raiden DX, medals stop shimmering for a brief moment, during which they award more points when collected. Enemies that carry medals appear more frequently in the new version.

Powerups
There are six types of powerups in Viper Phase 1. Players start with a primary vulcan cannon on each new life.
P (Power Up) - Original version: Powers up the main vulcan gun only. New version: Powers up the vulcan (if the player is without secondary weapons) and the active secondary weapons (up to four levels).
B (Bomb) - Adds one extra bomb. Players can carry up to seven bombs in stock.
L (Laser) - This weapon is similar to the blue laser weapon in the original Raiden series. The weapon has no defensive spread, but it has the highest damage potential out of the available weapons. The ship's weapon module flashes blue when using this weapon.
M (Burst Missile) - Cruise missiles that are fired in a burst pattern. When the missiles hit their mark, the resulting explosion deals overlapping secondary damage. The ship's weapon module flashes yellow when using this weapon.
N (Napalm Missile) - Upon impact with a target, missiles release green napalm explosions in various directions. These explosions deal overlapping secondary damage. This weapon is included in the Raiden Fighters series along with the ship (later named Judge Spear) in a guest appearance. The ship's module flashes green when using this weapon.
W (Wide Vulcan) - Grants the player a secondary widespread vulcan cannon. This weapon has the highest screen coverage, but has the least damage potential out of the available weapons. The ship's module flashes red when using this weapon.

Music
The soundtrack of Viper Phase 1 was composed by Go Sato. Its style is vastly different from the original Raiden series, incorporating many synthesized instruments. The soundtrack was released in 2005 as part of a superplay DVD set showing expert players playing through the game.

The official track listing:
 01 Title
 02 "Go Straight Ahead!!" (Stage 1 - Spaceport)
 03 "Outer Space" (Stage 2 - Space Fleet 1)
 04 "Mission Striker" (Stage 3 - Refueling Base)
 05 "Forcing Breakthrough" (Stage 4 - Storage Facility)
 06 "Invisible Enemy" (Stage 5 - Asteroid Belt)
 07 "Counteroffensive" (Stage 6 - Space Fleet 2)
 08 "Unknown Threat" (Stage 7 - Space Colony)
 09 "Destiny" (Stage 8 - Missile Silo)
 10 "Fear of Approaching" (Boss Theme)
 11 Stage Clear
 12 Ranking

The soundtrack is available as an unlockable in the Japanese-only release of Raiden DX for the PlayStation. When unlocked, players have the option of changing the default Raiden DX soundtrack to implement music from Viper Phase 1.

Hardware

Viper Phase 1 runs on the Seibu SPI System hardware. The later Raiden Fighters series uses the same hardware. The game software is stored on ROM daughterboards that are interchangeable on one SPI board. ROM daughterboards and Seibu SPI main boards are region-specific. For example, the Japanese daughterboards are not compatible with the European motherboard and vice versa.

Reception
In Japan, Game Machine listed Viper Phase 1 on their July 1, 1995 issue as being the ninth most-successful arcade game of the month. In North America, RePlay reported Viper Phase 1 was the sixth most-popular arcade game at the time. A critic for Next Generation praised the game's beautiful visuals and increasing level of difficulty, but added that "like all shooters, unless your hand-eye coordination is really solid, the fun will pass you right by". He gave it three out of five stars.

References

External links
 
 Viper Phase 1 at the Raiden Fighters Emporium
 Viper Phase 1 Soundtrack Information (Japanese)

1995 video games
Arcade video games
Arcade-only video games
Vertically scrolling shooters
Fabtek games
Seibu Kaihatsu games
Video games developed in Japan
Cooperative video games
Video games set in the 2050s